The 2015 Catalan regional election was held on Sunday, 27 September 2015, electing the 11th Parliament of the autonomous community of Catalonia. All 135 seats in the Parliament were up for election. This was the third regional Catalan election in only five years, after the 2010 and 2012 elections and the first one in over 37 years in which Democratic Convergence of Catalonia (CDC) and Democratic Union of Catalonia (UDC) ran separately, after the dissolution of Convergence and Union (CiU) in June 2015 over disagreements on the coalition's separatist turn.

The plan to hold a snap election in 2015 was announced on 14 January by President Artur Mas. After the non-binding 2014 independence referendum, Mas declared that the election was to be turned into an alternative vote on independence, with pro-independence parties including the independence goal in their election manifestos. As part of the process, CDC, along with Republican Left of Catalonia (ERC), Democrats of Catalonia (DC) and Left Movement (MES) would run together under the Junts pel Sí (JxSí) platform, with support from members of the pro-independence Catalan National Assembly (ANC), Òmnium and the Municipalities' Association for Independence (AMI). The alliance, however, failed to achieve its self-stated goal to attain an absolute majority on its own.

Newly formed Podemos (Spanish for "We can"), Initiative for Catalonia Greens (ICV), United and Alternative Left (EUiA) and Equo stood together under the Catalunya Sí que es Pot (Catalan for "Catalonia yes we can") label, a second novel electoral grouping formed for this election. The alliance was modeled after the Barcelona en Comú platform that won the 2015 Barcelona election, but it failed to garner the decisive support of the city's popular mayor Ada Colau and saw a poor performance. Citizens (C's) benefited from its anti-independence stance and climbed to second place ahead of a declining Socialists' Party of Catalonia (PSC), which scored a new historical low for the third election in a row. The People's Party (PP) suffered from its national counterpart decline and scored its worst result since 1992, whereas the left-wing Popular Unity Candidacy (CUP) saw a strong performance which allowed it to hold the key to government formation with JxSí.

Overview

Electoral system
The Parliament of Catalonia was the devolved, unicameral legislature of the autonomous community of Catalonia, having legislative power in regional matters as defined by the Spanish Constitution and the Catalan Statute of Autonomy, as well as the ability to vote confidence in or withdraw it from a regional president.

As a result of no regional electoral law having been approved since the re-establishment of Catalan autonomy, the electoral procedure came regulated under Transitory Provision Fourth of the 1979 Statute, supplemented by the provisions within the Organic Law of General Electoral Regime. Voting for the Parliament was on the basis of universal suffrage, which comprised all nationals over 18 years of age, registered in Catalonia and in full enjoyment of their political rights. Additionally, Catalans abroad were required to apply for voting before being permitted to vote, a system known as "begged" or expat vote. The 135 members of the Parliament of Catalonia were elected using the D'Hondt method and a closed list proportional representation, with an electoral threshold of three percent of valid votes—which included blank ballots—being applied in each constituency. Seats were allocated to constituencies, corresponding to the provinces of Barcelona, Girona, Lleida and Tarragona, with each being allocated a fixed number of seats.

The use of the D'Hondt method might result in a higher effective threshold, depending on the district magnitude.

Election date
The term of the Parliament of Catalonia expired four years after the date of its previous election, unless it was dissolved earlier. The regional president was required to call an election fifteen days prior to the date of expiry of parliament, with election day taking place within from forty to sixty days after the call. The previous election was held on 25 November 2012, which meant that the legislature's term would have expired on 25 November 2016. The election was required to be called no later than 10 November 2016, with it taking place up to the sixtieth day from the call, setting the latest possible election date for the Parliament on Monday, 9 January 2017.

The president had the prerogative to dissolve the Parliament of Catalonia and call a snap election, provided that no motion of no confidence was in process and that dissolution did not occur before one year had elapsed since a previous one under this procedure. In the event of an investiture process failing to elect a regional president within a two-month period from the first ballot, the Parliament was to be automatically dissolved and a fresh election called.

Background

Secessionist process

After the 2012 regional election resulted in Convergence and Union (CiU) unexpectedly losing seats, President Mas was placed in a difficult political position, as he fell 18 seats short of the absolute majority. He was forced to sign an agreement with Republican Left of Catalonia (ERC), in which the latter pledged to support the government, albeit without entering a formal coalition, in return for a faster process to obtain the independence of Catalonia.

On 23 January 2013, the Parliament of Catalonia adopted the Declaration of Sovereignty and of the Right to Decide of the Catalan People, which stated that "The people of Catalonia have—by reason of democratic legitimacy—the character of a sovereign political and legal entity." This declaration was provisionally suspended by the Constitutional Court of Spain on 8 May 2013, and on 25 March 2014 the same court declared that it was void and unconstitutional due to the fact that the Spanish Constitution of 1978 makes the Spanish people as a whole the only subject of sovereignty. At the same time, opinion polls began to show ERC topping the voters' preferences for the first time since the 1932 Catalan election, with the CiU vote declining as a result of the 2012 election backlash, but also because of Mas' management of the economic crisis and the involvement of several CiU leading figures in several corruption scandals. Among those involved was party founder Jordi Pujol, charged in a tax fraud scandal related to an undeclared inheritance in Andorra, accompanied by allegations of bribery, embezzlement, breach of trust, influence peddling, forgery of documents and money laundering crimes allegedly committed during his time as president of Catalonia.

On 12 December 2013, the Government of Catalonia announced that a non-binding referendum on the independence issue would be held on 9 November 2014, for the purpose of giving independence leaders a political mandate to negotiate with the Government of Spain. Mariano Rajoy's government stated shortly after its intention to block such a referendum, which it considered unconstitutional and not within the competences of the Autonomous Community.

In spite of this, a not legally sanctioned referendum was held as scheduled, with over 80% voting for independence, albeit on a low turnout of around 40%. Independence parties considered the result a success. Artur Mas explained in a public act on 25 November his plan to reach independence, proposing calling an extraordinary regional election—turned into an alternative vote on independence—at some point during 2015, on the condition that ERC agreed to join a common list with his party to stand together at the polls. ERC leader Oriol Junqueras agreed with most of the plan but initially refused such a joint list, threatening to break its government pact with CiU in order to force an election in early 2015. After weeks of calibrated brinkmanship from both sides, with CDC pushing for a joint candidature to cover for its forecasted loss of support and ERC refusing to run with Artur Mas as presidential candidate, both parties finally reached an agreement, and on 14 January 2015, Mas announced that a snap regional election would be held on 27 September that same year, with the intention to turn in into the true plebiscite on independence.

Aside from the pact to hold an extraordinary election, the agreement also included to complete state structures as a basic element to culminate the process of "national transition" as well as negotiation of budgets. Mas and Junqueras also apologized for the rarefied political climate between the pro-independence parties in the negotiations that had taken place during the weeks prior to the announcement.

The Spanish government, in response to the election announcement eight months ahead of the scheduled date, accused Mas of having "no interest in attending the Catalan people's problems, nor it has any capacity to solve them". The People's Party (PP), Spanish Socialist Workers' Party (PSOE) and Union, Progress and Democracy (UPyD) also criticized the announcement.

CiU breakup
Tension within both parties forming the CiU federation had reached an all-time high in June 2015 due to differences between the positions the Democratic Union of Catalonia (UDC) leadership and Democratic Convergence of Catalonia (CDC) leader Artur Mas took over the sovereignty process. CDC was in favour of outright independence even if it meant breaking the established Spanish legality, while UDC was against doing it without a successful negotiation with the Spanish Government. As a result, a vote was held on 14 June 2015 between UDC members, asking whether the party should commit itself to continue with the process but establishing several conditions—including not violating the legality in force through unilateral independence declarations—or starting the constituent processes at the margin of legal norms. The first option, supported by UDC leaders and contrary to the signed agreements between CDC, ERC and sovereignty entities, was approved by UDC members with a narrow 50.9% to 46.1% choosing to stand at the side of CDC. After this, CDC issued an ultimatum to UDC for the latter to decide within "two or three days" whether it committed itself to the independence plan. On 17 June, after a meeting of the UDC leadership, it was announced that the party was withdrawing all three of its members from the Government of the Generalitat of Catalonia, although they agreed to maintain parliamentary stability until the end of the legislature. That same day at night, the CDC national executive committee met and in a press conference the next day confirmed that UDC and CDC would not run together in the 2015 regional election, and that the political project of the CiU federation was over, signalling the end of 37 years of cooperation between both parties as Convergence and Union, a coalition which had dominated Catalan politics since the 1980s.

Run up to election
On 3 August 2015, Catalan president Artur Mas signed the election decree and highlighted the extraordinariness of the proposal's background, which nonetheless did not mention the word plebiscite. The President justified the extraordinary meaning of the election after having unsuccessfully tried to negotiate a legal and agreed-to referendum with the Government of Spain. Mas, however, did not mention how much support did he considered necessary for proceeding with the independence process. Only pro-independence parties recognized the plebiscitary character of the election, with other parties arguing that—acknowledging the election's importance—it still was an election to the Parliament of Catalonia as many others had been held in the past. The PP, PSC and C's, however, hinted on the possibility of a post-election pact to curb the independence process. The Spanish Government said it would keep a close watch closely the legality of the whole election process while demanding neutrality from Mas. Mariano Rajoy stated: "There won't be a plebiscitary election, as there wasn't a referendum", in relation to the 9 November 2014 vote. Several parties and media questioned the legality of holding the Free Way demonstration on 11 September, as it coincided with the start date of the election campaign.

Parliamentary composition
The Parliament of Catalonia was officially dissolved on 4 August 2015, after the publication of the dissolution decree in the Official Journal of the Government of Catalonia. The table below shows the composition of the parliamentary groups in the chamber at the time of dissolution.

Parties and candidates
The electoral law allowed for parties and federations registered in the interior ministry, coalitions and groupings of electors to present lists of candidates. Parties and federations intending to form a coalition ahead of an election were required to inform the relevant Electoral Commission within ten days of the election call, whereas groupings of electors needed to secure the signature of at least one percent of the electorate in the constituencies for which they sought election, disallowing electors from signing for more than one list of candidates.

Below is a list of the main parties and electoral alliances which contested the election:

Democratic Convergence of Catalonia (CDC), Republican Left of Catalonia (ERC), Democrats of Catalonia (DC) and Left Movement (MES) agreed by mid-July 2015 to run together under the Junts pel Sí joint separatist list, with support from the pro-independence Catalan National Assembly (ANC), Òmnium and the also separatist Municipalities' Association for Independence (AMI). Artur Mas was named as the agreed presidential candidate, even though, as a result of balance of power negotiations between ERC and CDC, he was placed 4th in the electoral ticket. Instead, the list was to be headed by three independent figures: Raül Romeva, former MEP for ICV who had left the party for not supporting independence; Carme Forcadell, former ANC president and Muriel Casals, Òmnium chairwoman. Oriol Junqueras would follow in 5th place.

The coalition was thus scheduled to comprise the ruling centre-right CDC; its supporting centre-left partner in parliament, ERC; DC and MES, pro-independence splits from UDC and PSC, respectively; and members from separatist sectors of the civil society. The Popular Unity Candidacy (CUP), which had also participated in the negotiations to form the unitary list, eventually refused on the grounds that "it was formed by politicians"—in reference to CDC and ERC's strong presence in the coalition's lists—and decided to run separately.

After the success of Ada Colau's Barcelona en Comú platform in the 2015 Barcelona municipal election, its member parties Podemos, Initiative for Catalonia Greens (ICV) and United and Alternative Left (EUiA) entered talks for coalescing into a similar, regional-wide coalition for the September election to run as an alternative to Mas' independence plan. By 15 July 2015, negotiations between the parties were already close to success, and it was agreed that they would stand together in the Catalunya Sí que es Pot electoral platform. On 23 July, Lluís Rabell was presented as the platform's candidate for the regional premiership, while ecologist party Equo announced its intention to join the coalition on 29 July.

Campaign

Party slogans

Party stances

Election debates

Opinion polls
The tables below list opinion polling results in reverse chronological order, showing the most recent first and using the dates when the survey fieldwork was done, as opposed to the date of publication. Where the fieldwork dates are unknown, the date of publication is given instead. The highest percentage figure in each polling survey is displayed with its background shaded in the leading party's colour. If a tie ensues, this is applied to the figures with the highest percentages. The "Lead" column on the right shows the percentage-point difference between the parties with the highest percentages in a poll.

Graphical summary

Voting intention estimates
The table below lists weighted voting intention estimates. Refusals are generally excluded from the party vote percentages, while question wording and the treatment of "don't know" responses and those not intending to vote may vary between polling organisations. When available, seat projections determined by the polling organisations are displayed below (or in place of) the percentages in a smaller font; 68 seats were required for an absolute majority in the Parliament of Catalonia.

Results

Overall

Distribution by constituency

Aftermath

Government formation

Following the failure to choose a leader in January 2016 in which 1,515 CUP members voted for Mas and the same number voted against him, the assembly was due to be dissolved on 10 January and a new election called in March. Rajoy supported the new election on the grounds that it could "quash" calls for independence.

A last minute deal was struck between Junts pel Sí and Popular Unity Candidacy to ensure a separatist government, although without Mas as president. As a result, Carles Puigdemont assumed office on 12 January 2016 as Catalan president after his investiture was approved by the Parliament on 10 January.

2016 motion of confidence

Notes

References
Opinion poll sources

Other

Catalonia
Regional elections in Catalonia
2015 in Catalonia
September 2015 events in Spain